A building is a constructed object intended for occupancy by humans or animals. 

Building may also refer to:

Books and magazines
 Building (magazine), a British magazine
 Building (Australian magazine)

Film and television
Le Building, a 2005 French animated short film
The Building (film), a 1999 Vietnamese film
The Building (TV series), a 1993 American television series

Music
Buildings (album), an album by Northern Irish band General Fiasco
Building (Sense Field album)
 "Building", a song by Poi Dog Pondering on their album Volo Volo
 "Building", scene 1 from the fourth act of Einstein on the Beach, composed by Philip Glass

Other uses
 Building (mathematics), a type of geometric structure
 Building, a classification used by the U.S. National Register of Historic Places
 In computer programming, building is the process by which source code is converted into executable object code; see compiler
 Building or Online creation, the name for creating areas and objects in online games

See also
Structure (disambiguation)
Structure & Nonbuilding structure
Architectural structure, a man-made structure used or intended for supporting or sheltering any use or continuous occupancy